Lactimidomycin is a glutarimide antibiotic derived from the bacteria Streptomyces amphibiosporus. It has antifungal, antiviral and anti-cancer properties, acting as a direct inhibitor of protein translation in ribosomes. Antiviral activity is seen against a variety of RNA viruses including flaviviruses such as dengue fever, Kunjin virus and Modoc virus, as well as vesicular stomatitis virus and poliovirus. As lactimidomycin is a natural product containing an unusual unsaturated 12-membered lactone ring, it has been the subject of numerous total synthesis approaches.

References 

Dengue fever
Antiviral drugs
Glutarimides
Lactones